Futureworld is the fourth album by the American band Trans Am, released in 1999. The band uses lyrics in their songs for the first time, employing vocoder synthesis.

Critical reception
Trouser Press wrote that "the heavily processed, robotic singing takes a back seat to the grooves that nearly imprison these songs with their droning insistence." The Village Voice called the album "arguably [the band's] definitive futurist new wave statement."

Track listings
 "1999"
 "Television Eyes"
 "Futureworld"
 "City In Flames"
 "AM Rhein"
 "Cocaine Computer"
 "Runners Standing Still"
 "Futureworld II"
 "Positron"
 "Sad and Young"

Additional tracks on Japanese release
 "Alec Empire is a Nazi/Hippie"
 "Am Rhein (Party Mix)"
 "Woffen Shenter"
 "Thriddle Giggit Dream"
 "Ardroth Marketplace"

References

1999 albums
Trans Am (band) albums
Thrill Jockey albums